Dušan Hanák (April 27, 1938 in Bratislava) is a Slovak film director.

Hanák graduated from the FAMU (Film and TV School of the Academy of Performing Arts) in Prague in 1965. He began with a series of shorts at the Koliba film studios in Bratislava. Several of them received awards, and so did his first feature film 322 (the code for cancer in medical records of diseases, 1969).

Career

Hanák followed it with the still admired feature-length documentary Pictures of the Old World (Obrazy starého sveta, 1972), partly a meditation on what lies hidden beneath the concept of "an authentic life", a theme already addressed in 322. Although Hanák was treated with suspicion by the more repressive communist authorities that took over after the Warsaw Pact invasion of Czechoslovakia, he found an early refuge in a topic sufficiently removed from big politics to survive on the margins of official production and yet, executed with a finesse that gave it a wide international appeal. In the most extraordinary section, an old man talks with great fascination and lucidity about space travel, recalling how two astronauts walked on the moon and collected rocks while a third circled in their spaceship. Tacked to the wall of his crumbling shack is a small photograph of men walking on the moon. It is a beautiful, elegiac work whose images could apply to Appalachia or any other poor region.
Good reviews or not, Pictures of the Old World was ordered shelved after the briefest of theatrical runs. Nevertheless, despite the authorities' surly take on Hanák's films, his next venture, Rosy Dreams, turned out to be another original work. His film I Love, You Love won the Silver Bear for Best Director at the 39th Berlin International Film Festival.

Filmography
 322 (1969)
 Pictures of the Old World (1972)
 Rosy Dreams (1977)
 Silent Joy (1985)
 I Love, You Love (1989)
 Private Lives (1990)
 Paper Heads (1995)

References

External links
 Slovak Movie Database
 
 Dušan Hanák (director) 322 , 1969. (Clip.)

1938 births
Living people
Slovak film directors
Silver Bear for Best Director recipients